The 1978 All-Ireland Under-21 Football Championship was the 15th staging of the All-Ireland Under-21 Football Championship since its establishment by the Gaelic Athletic Association in 1964.

Kerry entered the championship as defending champions in search of a record-breaking fourth successive All-Ireland title.

On 15 October 1978, Roscommon won the championship following a 1-9 to 1-8 defeat of Kerry in the All-Ireland final. This was their second All-Ireland title overall and their first in 12 championship seasons.

Results

All-Ireland Under-21 Football Championship

Semi-finals

Final

Statistics

Miscellaneous

 The All-Ireland semi-final between Kerry and Louth was originally fixed for 27 August 1978, however, Kerry disclosed to the GAA authorities that they would not be fielding a team as several of their players were also involved with the senior team in the All-Ireland final. Louth were declared the winners of that tie and were given a place in the All-Ireland final, however, an appeal by Kerry saw the game refixed. The refixture ended in dramatic circumstances as the score appeared to be level at the end of normal time, however, the referee later stated that Kerry had won by two points.

References

1978
All-Ireland Under-21 Football Championship